Felton Railroad Station is a historic railway station located at Felton, Delaware, United States, that is listed on the National Register of Historic Places.

Description
The station was built by the Delaware Railroad in 1868, and is a one-story, five bay, brick, Italianate-style building. It as a low hipped roof with shallow eaves, round-headed doorways and windows, and a projecting bow-front window. The station has been renovated for use as a museum.

It was added to the National Register of Historic Places July 13, 1981.

See also

 National Register of Historic Places listings in Kent County, Delaware

References

External links

 Town of Felton website

Railway stations on the National Register of Historic Places in Delaware
Italianate architecture in Delaware
Railway stations in the United States opened in 1868
Former Pennsylvania Railroad stations
National Register of Historic Places in Kent County, Delaware
Former railway stations in Delaware